The 2011 ACC Women's Twenty20 Championship was an international women's cricket tournament held in Kuwait from 18 to 25 February 2011. It was organised by the Asian Cricket Council (ACC).

Ten teams participated in the tournament, down from twelve at the previous edition in 2009. Iran and Qatar were the teams that did not return. The ten teams were divided into groups of five, one of which was topped by China and the other by Nepal. China defeated Thailand in the first semi-final, but Nepal were defeated by Hong Kong in the other. Hong Kong went on to also defeat China in the final, winning their second consecutive title.

Group stages

Group A

Group B

Knockouts

Semi-finals

Final

Placement matches

3rd-place play-off

5th-place play-off

7th-place play-off

9th-place play-off

Statistics

Most runs
The top five runscorers are included in this table, ranked by runs scored and then by batting average.

Source: CricketArchive

Most wickets

The top five wicket-takers are listed in this table, ranked by wickets taken and then by bowling average.

Source: CricketArchive

Final standing

References 

2011
International cricket competitions in Kuwait
International cricket competitions in 2011
2011 in Kuwaiti sport
2011 in women's cricket